A fight is a purposeful violent conflict of combat intended to establish dominance over the opposition.

Fight or fighting may also refer to:

Sport
 Combat sport
 Fighting in ice hockey
 Martial arts
Philadelphia Fight, an American rugby league team

Arts, entertainment, and media

Film
 Fighting (2009 film), a 2009 action film directed by Dito Montiel
 Fighting (2014 film), a 2014 Chinese action-romance film directed by Yu Junhao

Music

Groups
 Fight (band), a band assembled by Judas Priest frontman, Rob Halford

Albums
 Fight (Doro album), 2002
 Fight (Flipper album), 2009
 Fight (Mayumi Iizuka album), 2009
 Fight (Kanjani Eight album), 2011
 Fighting (Tank album), 2006
 Fighting (Thin Lizzy album), 1975
 Fight (EP), a 2013 EP by Sister Sparrow & the Dirty Birds
 Fight, a 1993 album by Naked Truth

Songs
"Fight" (song), a Eurovision song by Natalia Barbu
"Fight", theme song and single by The Musketeers from the BBC TV series The Flashing Blade, 1969
"Fight", song by The Rolling Stones from Dirty Work, 1986
"Fight (No Matter How Long)", song by The Bunburys from 1988 Summer Olympics Album: One Moment in Time
"Fight," song by Lee DeWyze from Frames
"Fight", song by Sons of Angels, 1990
"Fight", a song by Brockhampton from Saturation II
"Fight", a song by NEFFEX
"Fight", a song by Gotthard from Firebirth, 2012
"Fighting" (song) by Tyler Joe Miller, 2020
"Fighting" (Yellowcard song), from Paper Walls

Gaming
 Fighting game, a genre of videogames

Other
 Waist clothes or fights, colored clothes or sheets hung around the outside of a ship's upper works

See also

 Affray
 Dogfight (disambiguation)
 Fight Club (disambiguation)
 Fighter (disambiguation)
 Fite (disambiguation) 
 Infighting (disambiguation)
 Paiting, also known as fighting, a common expression used in the Korean language to rally or cheer someone